Nzakambay (Njak Mbai), or Nzakambay Mbum, is an Mbum language of southern Chad and northern Cameroon.

References

Languages of Chad
Languages of Cameroon
Mbum languages